Southland Station is a CTrain light rail station in Southwood, Calgary, Alberta. It serves the South Line (Route 201) and opened on May 25, 1981, as part of the original line. The station is located on the exclusive LRT right of way (adjacent to CPR ROW), 9.5 km south of the City Hall interlocking at Southland Drive.

The station consists of a center-loading platform with mezzanine access on the North end and grade-level access at the South end. 650 spaces are available for parking at the station.

In 2005, the station registered an average transit of 10,500 boardings per weekday.

On July 12, 2016, a flash flood occurred at Southland Park and Ride. This flash flood flooded with high water marks on some cars above the headlights of the cars causing water ingress into engines and car interiors.

Upgrades
The station was originally accessible only from the West side of the tracks; accessing the Southland Business Center required a long walk north to Southland Drive, along Southland Drive over the tracks, and South again on the other side. In November 2009, a pedestrian overpass was added to the Southland Park business centre, which allows for much quicker access to the business park.

Southland station was originally built to accommodate the three-car trains in use at the time of construction. On February 3, 2011, construction was begun to renovate the platform to accommodate 4-car trains. On March 19, 2011, service at the platform was halted until May 6 to facilitate the construction of the upgrade.

The upgrade was completed in late August 2011.

Crime 
Southland Station has been criticized for being a crime hotspot in the Calgary C-Train System. On a CityNews interview in January 2022 with Calgary Transit Lead Staff 'Stephen Tauro', it was listed as one of the 5 stations with an unusually high crime rate. The others being: Marlborough, Rundle, Heritage and Sunalta Stations. 

An hour after a stabbing took place at 4th Street LRT Station on the night of January 10, 2022, another unrelated stabbing took place at Southland Station.

References

CTrain stations
Railway stations in Canada opened in 1981